Münchenwiler-Courgevaux railway station is a railway station in the municipality of Münchenwiler, in the Swiss canton of Bern. It is an intermediate stop on the standard gauge Fribourg–Ins line of Transports publics Fribourgeois.

Services
 the following services stop at Münchenwiler-Courgevaux:

 RER Fribourg  / :

References

External links 
 
 

Railway stations in the canton of Bern
Transports publics Fribourgeois stations